Neville Kenneth Glover  (born 22 July 1955) is an Australian former professional rugby league footballer who played in the 1970s and 1980s. A New South Wales interstate and Australia international representative , he played his club football in the NSWRL Premiership with the Parramatta Eels and Penrith Panthers. Now retired following his distinguished service as a NSW Police Prosecutor, Neville lives on the Central Coast of New south South Wales with his beautiful wife Sharyn. In retirement see Neville as busy as ever. Always in demand for speaking engagements and his never ending Charity work.

Playing career
A Seven Hills junior, Glover made his debut for Parramatta in 1975. The following year Parramatta reached the grand final which was played against Manly-Warringah. With ten minutes of the match remaining and 15 metres out from a wide-open try line Glover dropped ball over the line after Parramatta started a sweeping move from one side of the field to the other.

Speaking in 2008 about the game, Glover said "Mate I'm at a prosecutors conference today and the dropped ball thing has already been mentioned twice, I wouldn't say it gets brought up daily but certainly once a week it gets a mention". Glover dropped the pass which could have given the Eels the match-winning try.

In 1978, Glover made his Australian test debut in Brisbane against a touring New Zealand side in the second of a three-test series. He scored the first of his two tries of the match after being on the field for only two minutes. He is listed on the Australian Players Register as Kangaroo No. 511. Glover also represented New South Wales in 1979 against Great Britain.

Following a grand final loss in reserve grade, Glover left Parramatta. He played one more season with Penrith in 1983.

Accolades
In 2002, a team of the greatest Parramatta players, known as the Parramatta Legends, were selected based on a public vote of fans.  Glover was selected on the wing.

Post playing
After playing, Glover went into coaching and later became a police officer.  Glover became the senior sergeant in charge of all Hunter Region police prosecutors.

References

1955 births
Living people
Australian police officers
Australian rugby league players
Sportsmen from New South Wales
Rugby league players from Sydney
Parramatta Eels players
Australia national rugby league team players
New South Wales rugby league team players
City New South Wales rugby league team players
Penrith Panthers players
Rugby league wingers
Recipients of the Medal of the Order of Australia